Bokani Soko is a Zambian lawyer (barrister) and businessman specialising in international trade. He sits on the boards of various companies.

Early life and education 

Soko attended University of Zambia from 2004 to 2009 where he obtained a Bachelor of Laws (Legum Baccalaureus; LL.B) degree.

In 2007, Soko was admitted to the bar after passing a Legal Practitioners Qualification Examination (LPQE) at the Zambia Institute of Advanced Legal Education, which is a prerequisite post-graduate certificate for one to practice law in Zambia.

Legal profession career 

Soko is a Lawyer and Advocate of the High Court of Zambia, having obtained an LL.B. degree from the University of Zambia and a Bar Practicing Certificate from the Zambia Institute of Advanced Legal Education (ZIALE). He is a Managing Partner in a premier law firm, Ferd Jere and Co Legal Practitioners, where he specializes in Litigation, Business Advisory and General Counsel. As a practising lawyer, he has played various roles as an official, lawyer and advisor in various business in Zambia and other Southern African countries. He has represented a number of companies on wide range of issues that includes energy, agriculture, taxation, environment and disputes arising from development agreements with governments.

Professional memberships 

Currently, Soko is a member of the Law Association of Zambia.

Personal life 

Soko is married with children.

References

21st-century Zambian lawyers
University of Zambia alumni
Living people
People from Lusaka
Year of birth missing (living people)